The 32nd Lambda Literary Awards were announced on June 1, 2020, to honour works of LGBT literature published in 2019. Due to the COVID-19 pandemic in the United States, there was no gala ceremony; instead, the winners were announced exclusively through social media and the press.

The nominees were announced in March 2020.

Special awards

Nominees and winners

References

Lambda
2020 in LGBT history
Lambda Literary Awards
Lists of LGBT-related award winners and nominees
Lambda
2020 awards in the United States